Old Providence Stone Church is a historic church in Spottswood, Virginia in Augusta County, Virginia.

A log structure was built in the area by 1743 for early settlers known as the South Mountain Meeting House. In 1746 the congregation split, and the stone building was built in 1793 on land donated by Patrick and Susana Hall. In 1844, Associate Reformed Presbyterian Church of the South. In 1859, a new building was built for services, and a school used the stone building until the American Civil War, and then a store and residence. From 1888 it was used as a high school for the valley until the early 20th century, and then a meeting room until a fire in 1959 destroyed the interior.

It was added to the National Register on December 5, 1972.

Robert McCormick (1780–1846), patriarch of the McCormick family which includes Cyrus McCormick, is buried in the cemetery, along with other members of the family. The McCormick Estate just to the south is now a historic museum and experimental farm.
The parents of sewing machine inventor James Edward Allen Gibbs are also buried in the small stone walled cemetery near the old church. A new church and larger modern cemetery are across the State Route 919 (known as "Old Providence Road) to the east.

References

External links

 

Presbyterian churches in Virginia
Churches completed in 1793
Churches in Augusta County, Virginia
Churches on the National Register of Historic Places in Virginia
Stone churches in Virginia
National Register of Historic Places in Augusta County, Virginia
18th-century churches in the United States
1793 establishments in Virginia